Mohsen Faqihi (Persian: محسن فقیهی) (born 1952) is an Iranian Twelver Shi'a Ayatollah.
He has studied in seminaries of Qum, Iran under Morteza Haeri Yazdi, Mohammad-Reza Golpaygani and Mohammad Ali Araki. Faqihi is known for his book Maʻrifat Abwāb al-Fiqh in which he summarized Tahrir al-Wasilah. He is a member of the Society of Seminary Teachers of Qom.

See also
List of Ayatollahs

Notes

External links
Personal Website

Iranian ayatollahs
Iranian Islamists
Shia Islamists
1952 births
Living people